Sego is an unincorporated community in Perry County, in the U.S. state of Ohio.

History
Sego had its start in 1846 when a blacksmith shop was built there; a mill soon followed. The name Sego is said to be African in origin.  A post office called Sego was established in 1850, and the town was once booming and had a population of 167. While the town was thriving in 1865, a murder took place. The town had never had any violence and they were dumbstruck upon a 12-year-old girl being raped and murdered. Her body was discovered on Walters hill which is northeast of the town. Legend says that her spirit haunts a triangular land that stretches from a pond her remains were found closest to, down to a second corner where a smaller stream meets Turkey Run, and then up on top of a hill northwest of Sego.  After the murder, the town was terrified. Two weeks later, two small kids went swimming in the pond northeast of Sego and they were to never be found again. Many think their bodies still lay in the depths of the pond. Just two days later, there was a mass suicide where eight people hung themselves on the hill northwest of Sego. While many bridges were built off Turkey Run, all collapsed, leading to severe injuries and one death. The town continued having experiences like this for many years until the flu of 1918 came through and killed 89 people, leaving just six survivors. All the remains were burnt. In 1935 the blacksmith shop collapsed and all of the buildings were torn down to make way for farmland, and the town was no longer in operation.

References

Unincorporated communities in Perry County, Ohio
Unincorporated communities in Ohio
1846 establishments in Ohio